Brin-Jonathan Butler (born 1979) is a freelance journalist, Amazon interviewer, filmmaker and host of the podcast Tourist Information. His work has been published in The Classical, The Rumpus, Harper's, The Daily Beast, Vice, ESPN The Magazine, The Paris Review, The Huffington Post and Salon.com. His book A Cuban Boxer's Journey was published 2014. The Domino Diaries was published in 2015. The Grandmaster: Magnus Carlsen and the Match That Made Chess Great Again was published in 2018 and longlisted for the 2020 RBC Taylor Prize.

Butler has a forthcoming documentary film, Split-Decision, examining Cuban–American relations.

Butler is a member of the Boxing Writers Association of America and PEN America.

Butler is also a member of Transnational Boxing Rankings Board, a respected international boxing rankings organization that was formed in 2012.

Publications

Books 

A Cuban Boxer's Journey: Guillermo Rigondeaux, from Castro's Traitor to American Champion, 2014, Picador: a biography on Guillermo Rigondeaux

The Domino Diaries: My Decade Boxing with Olympic Champions and Chasing Hemingway's Ghost in the Last Days of Castro's Cuba, 2015, Picador: a memoir of time in Cuba living and training with Olympic boxing coaches. The Domino Diaries was on The Boston Globe's list of Best Books of 2015 and was shortlisted for the PEN/ESPN Award for Literary Sports Writing in 2016.

The Grandmaster: Magnus Carlsen and the Match That Made Chess Great Again, 2018, Simon & Schuster. Longlisted for the 2020 RBC Taylor Prize.

Kindle Singles 

Errol Morris: The Kindle Singles Interview, 2015 

Mike Tyson: The Kindle Singles Interview, 2014

Articles 

ESPN

 What More Could Have Angulo Given Us? 
 Donaire-Rigondeaux Full of Promises 
 This Way Out: Inside the High Paced Underground Economy of Smuggling Champion Boxers 
 Donaire-Rigondeaux Full of Promise 

Salon

 Sparring with Mike Tyson 
 The Way We Left Cuba 
 Cuba's Forgotten Champ 

SBNation

 Requiem for a Welterweight 
 Training Pampered Motherfuckers: Eric Kelly Schools the 1% 
 Gold in the Mud 
 Hero's for Sale: The Agony of the Cuban Athlete 
 After the Fall: 25 Years after Mike Tyson lost to Buster Douglas, why do we still have sympathy for the devil? 
 "Mayweather vs Pacquiao: The Poison Oasis" 

Vice

 The Horrors of Staying in Touch on Facebook 

Aljazeera

 Hurricane Carter's Obituary

References

External links 

 
 Split Decision: The Guillermo Rigondeaux Story
 On the Ropes: Freddie Roach
 Ali vs Stevenson: The Greatest Fight That Never Was
 

American documentary film directors
Living people
1979 births